Bunchosia glandulifera, commonly known as peanut butter fruit, is a species of flowering plant in the acerola family, Malpighiaceae, that is native to Central America and South America. It produces small orange-red fruits of sticky and dense pulp, with a flavour and aroma resembling that of peanut butter. It is mostly eaten fresh, but is also used for jellies, jams or preserves. The superficial appearance of the berries are similar to coffee and in Brazil is accordingly called caferana or falso guarana. 

Bunchosia glandulifera has been introduced to the U.S. horticulture as Bunchosia argentea and was further distributed under this name.

Description 
The leaves are lightly sericeous (hairy) and have wavy edges. Bunchosia glandulifera grows as an evergreen shrub or smaller tree up to about 7–8 meters high. In cultivation the tree ideally reaches up to 6 metres (20 feet) in diameter, although can be maintained to a smaller size. The bark is grayish-brown, smooth to slightly rough or nodular. The trunk provides rubber. The tree is fast-growing and has some frost-tolerance.

Despite being misidentified as Bunchosia argentea, Bunchosia glandulifera can be easily distinguished. In Bunchosia argentea the leaves are flat, and the back side of the leaf is silvery due to very dense appressed hairs that completely hide the epidermis. In Bunchosia glandulifera the leaves are notably wavy at the margin; on the back side of the leaf there are hairs, but they are not nearly dense enough to hide the epidermis. Furthermore Bunchosia argentea has not been cultivated.

The fruits are ellipsoidal, almost smooth, slightly hairy and orange to red, briefly tipped berries with a thin, somewhat rubbery skin. They are about 2–3.5 centimeters long and contain 1 or mostly 2 free, about 1–1.5 centimeters long and light brownish, elliptical, somewhat flattened on one side and relatively smooth and bony seeds. The red pulp is sticky, slightly juicy and sweet. Fruits can be harvested not yet fully ripe, still orange, and then left to ripen for two days, to become red and soft.

References

External links

glandulifera
Plants described in 1822
Trees of Colombia
Trees of Venezuela
Trees of Peru
Tropical fruit